Radna may refer to:
Radna, Sevnica, Slovenian settlement
Radna, a village in Lipova, Arad County, Romania

See also
Ratna (disambiguation)